is the 15th studio album by Japanese singer/songwriter Yōko Oginome. Released through Victor Entertainment on December 16, 1994, the album was produced by Rod Antoon and features songs composed by Yūko Ishikawa, with Oginome co-writing three of them. While no singles were generated from this album, "Sha-La-La" was included as the B-side of the single "Koi no Hallelujah". The album was reissued on May 26, 2010, with six bonus tracks as part of Oginome's 25th anniversary celebration.

The album peaked at No. 97 on Oricon's albums chart and sold over 5,000 copies.

Track listing 
All lyrics are written by Yūko Ishikawa, except where indicated; all music is composed by Yūko Ishikawa, except where indicated; all tracks are arranged by Rod Antoon, except where indicated.

Charts

References

External links
 
 
 

1994 albums
Yōko Oginome albums
Japanese-language albums
Victor Entertainment albums